Yakimets is a rural locality (a settlement) in Kupreyevskoye Rural Settlement, Gus-Khrustalny District, Vladimir Oblast, Russia. The population was 103 as of 2010.

Geography 
Yakimets is located 56 km south of Gus-Khrustalny (the district's administrative centre) by road. Kupreyevo is the nearest rural locality.

References 

Rural localities in Gus-Khrustalny District